Elonus simplex is a species of ant-like leaf beetle in the family Aderidae. It is found in Central America and North America.

References

Further reading

 
 
 

Aderidae
Articles created by Qbugbot
Beetles described in 1993